Muddy Waters (1913–1983) was an American blues artist who is considered a pioneer of the electric Chicago blues and a major influence on the development of blues and rock music. He popularized several early Delta blues songs, such as "Rollin' and Tumblin'", "Walkin' Blues", and "Baby, Please Don't Go", and recorded songs that went on to become blues standards, including "Hoochie Coochie Man",  "Mannish Boy", and "Got My Mojo Working". During his recording career from 1941 to 1981, he recorded primarily for two record companies, Aristocrat/Chess and Blue Sky; they issued 62 singles and 13 studio albums (as with most postwar blues musicians, his recordings were released as two-song singles until the 1960s, when the focus shifted to long-playing albums).

While he was living in Mississippi, Waters was recorded by Alan Lomax in 1941 for a U.S. Library of Congress folk music project.  Two songs were released on a 78 rpm record, "Country Blues"  and "I Be's Troubled".  After moving to Chicago, he recorded for Leonard Chess and Aristocrat issued Waters's first single in 1947.  In 1950, Chess bought out his label partners and formed Chess Records. From 1950 to 1958, Chess issued 15 singles that reached the top 10 of Billboard magazine's R&B chart.  Among the many albums the label released are the influential early compilation The Best of Muddy Waters (1958) and the live At Newport 1960.

After Chess went out of business in 1975, Waters recorded several successful albums for Blue Sky.  Produced by blues rock singer and guitarist Johnny Winter,  Hard Again (1977), I'm Ready (1978), and Muddy "Mississippi" Waters – Live (1978) won Grammy Awards for "Best Ethnic or Traditional Recordings".  As a sideman, Waters also contributed to recordings by Little Walter, Junior Wells, Otis Spann, and others. After Waters's death in 1983, a large number of compilation and live albums have been issued by various record companies, often with significant overlap and duplication.  The double disc The Anthology: 1947–1972 (2001) is ranked at number 483 on Rolling Stone magazine's 2020 list of the "500 Greatest Albums of All Time".

Singles 
Muddy Waters's first 78 rpm record in 1941 listed him using his birth name, McKinley Morganfield. The late 1940s–mid-1950s record releases by Aristocrat Records and Chess Records sometimes used "Muddy Waters and His Guitar" as well as Muddy Waters. From the late 1950s on, he is identified as Muddy Waters.

Studio albums

Selected live albums 
Since Waters's death in 1983, a large number of live albums have been released by a variety of record companies. According to biographer Robert Gordon, "much of it comes from the latter years and the recordings tend to blend."  However, some were well-received and appeared on Billboard's Blues albums chart.

Selected compilation albums 
Muddy Waters's original two-song singles recorded for Chess were later released on various "Best of" and anthology albums.  Over the years, many were repackaged with new titles and re-sequenced, with the earlier versions going out-of-print.  In the 1990s, Chess's successor, MCA Records, began releasing compilations, sometimes focusing on different periods during Waters's career as well as broader overviews.  Around the same time, Charly Records also released a number of albums of Chess recordings, including the nine CD set The Complete Muddy Waters 1947–1967 (1992). After years of litigation, MCA was able to stop Charly from using Chess material without authorization.

As accompanist

Singles

Albums

Notes
Footnotes

Citations

References

Discographies of American artists
Blues discographies